World Series of Fighting 20: Branch vs. McElligott was a mixed martial arts event held  in Mashantucket, Connecticut, United States. This event aired on NBCSN in the U.S and on TSN2 in Canada.

Background
The main event was originally scheduled to feature the second semifinal fight of the WSOF Light Heavyweight Championship tournament between Matt Hamill and Vinny Magalhães. But on March 5, 2015, it was announced that Magalhães was taken out of the tournament due to contractual problems between the World Series of Fighting and Titan Fighting Championship.

The main event was then changed to a fight between WSOF Middleweight Champion David Branch and Ronny Markes for the second semifinal fight of the WSOF Light Heavyweight Championship tournament. However, on the day of the weigh-in, Markes was forced out of the bout due to dehydration and was replaced by promotional newcomer Jesse McElligott. McElligott's original opponent, Steve Skrzat, was removed from the card entirely and paid his show and win money.

Results

Tournament bracket

See also 
 List of WSOF champions
 List of WSOF events

References

World Series of Fighting events
2015 in mixed martial arts